Admiral Sir Robert Stopford  (5 February 1768 – 25 June 1847), was a distinguished officer in the Royal Navy whose career spanned over 60 years, from the French Revolutionary Wars to the Syrian War.

Naval career
Stopford was the third son of James Stopford, 2nd Earl of Courtown, and his wife Mary (née Powys). He joined the Royal Navy in 1780 and became a Lieutenant in 1785. In 1790 he was promoted to captain at the age of 22 and was briefly captain of HMS Lowestoffe.

Stopford fought at the Battle of the Glorious First of June in 1794, commanding the frigate  (32). During the battle Aquilon had the task of standing off and repeating the signals from the flagship.  Aquilon also towed the Marlborough out of the line of fire when she was dismasted, for which Lord Howe thanked him personally. One of Stopford's officers on Aquilon was Francis Beaufort, the inventor of the Beaufort Wind-Scale.

On 10 March 1796, Stopford was captain of the fifth rate frigate HMS Phaeton, of 38 guns, when she engaged and captured the 20-gun French corvette Bonne Citoyenne of Cape Finisterre.  Stopford took her back to England as his prize. The Royal Navy then bought her in as HMS Bonne Citoyenne, a sixth rate sloop of war. During his service in the Channel, Phaeton captured in all some 13 privateers and three vessels of war, as well as recovering numerous vessels that the French had taken.

In 1799, Stopford was appointed captain of the 74-gun third rate HMS Excellent in the Channel Fleet. He sailed Excellent to the West Indies where he hoisted a commodore's pennant and served for eight months as the Commander-in-Chief of the Leeward Islands Station in 1802.

In 1803, Stopford became captain of the ship of the line  (74), in Horatio Nelson's fleet.

He became a Colonel of Marines in November 1805 and received a gold medal for his conduct at the Battle of San Domingo in 1806, while still in command of Spencer. Stopford was wounded during the battle; he recovered, but the wound would plague him for the rest of his life.

He took part in the British invasions of the Río de la Plata and Battle of Copenhagen of 1806–07, and attacked Rochefort in 1808. Stopford played an important part in the Battle of the Basque Roads. He was appointed to command HMS Caesar (80), with a squadron of two ships of the line and five frigates. On 23 February 1809 he fell in the four French frigates under the batteries of Sable d'Olonne, an action which left them disabled. Stopford continued his blockade until Lord Gambier chased a fleet of ten French sail of the line into the Basque Roads and assumed command. In the summer of 1809 he was called as a witness at the Court-martial of James, Lord Gambier which assessed whether Admiral Lord Gambier had failed to support Captain Lord Cochrane. Gambier was controversially cleared of all charges.

In 1810, he sailed to South Africa to become Commander-in-Chief of the Cape of Good Hope Station. He directed the operations that resulted in the capture of Java when on 8 August 1811, the Dutch settlement of Batavia capitulated to the British under Stopford and Lieutenant-General Sir Samuel Auchmuty. The British fleet consisted of some 100 vessels, including eight cruisers belonging to the East India Company. He was appointed Commander-in-Chief, Portsmouth in 1827.

Stopford became Rear-Admiral of the United Kingdom in 1834. His last active post, in his early seventies, was as commander-in-chief of the Mediterranean fleet during the Syrian War against the forces of Mehemet Ali. As Vice Admiral on board  (100) and subsequently , he was in command of the combined British, Turkish, and Austrian fleet during the bombardment of Acre on 3 November 1840. For his services in the Syrian War, Stopford was given the Freedom of the City of the City of London and presented with a commemorative "freedom box". The ornate silver and oak box is part of the collection of the National Maritime Museum, Greenwich. The following year he became Governor of the Greenwich Hospital at Greenwich, with the rank of admiral.

He is buried in Greenwich Hospital Cemetery. The cemetery was largely made into a pocket park in the late 19th century but his name is listed on the west face of the Officers in the centre of the park.

Family

Stopford married Mary, daughter of Robert Fanshawe, in 1809. Their eldest son, Robert Fanshawe Stopford (1811–1891), also rose to the rank of admiral, and their second son, James John Stopford (1817–1868), became a vice admiral. Stopford died in June 1847, aged 79. His wife survived him by almost twenty years and died in June 1866.

He was one of the two Whig MPs for Ipswich in the United Kingdom parliament from 1806 to 1807.

See also

References

|-

|-

|-

|-

|-

1768 births
1847 deaths
Royal Navy admirals
Knights Grand Cross of the Order of the Bath
Knights Grand Cross of the Order of St Michael and St George
Royal Navy personnel of the French Revolutionary Wars
Royal Navy personnel of the Napoleonic Wars
Royal Navy personnel of the Egyptian–Ottoman War (1839–1841)
Recipients of the Order of St. George of the Second Degree
Younger sons of earls
Robert
Commanders Cross of the Military Order of Maria Theresa
Whig (British political party) MPs for English constituencies
Members of the Parliament of the United Kingdom for Ipswich